Salvatori is a surname. People with that name include:

Craig Salvatori, Australian rugby player
Domenico Salvatori (1855-1909), Italian castrati singer 
Henry Salvatori, American geophysicist 
Ilaria Salvatori, Italian fencer 
Maristela Salvatori, Italian artist 
Michael Salvatori, American composer 
Nay Salvatori, Mexican politician
Renato Salvatori, Italian actor 
Stefano Salvatori (1967-2017), Italian footballer

See also
Salvatori (design), an Italian natural-stone design brand
Odontophrynus salvatori, a frog species
Salvatore (disambiguation)

Italian-language surnames